List of the main sculptures found in Póvoa de Varzim, Portugal.

References

Buildings and structures in Póvoa de Varzim
Landmarks in Póvoa de Varzim
Sculptures in Portugal
Tourist attractions in Póvoa de Varzim